Leland Stanford Roberts (1884–1949), commonly known as Lee S. Roberts, was an American composer and pianist.

He is best known for his composition 'Smiles' with lyricist J. Will Callahan, written in 1917, but was a prolific composer across many genres of music.

He was also the vice-president of the QRS Music Roll Company, and recorded hundreds of piano rolls under his name and also the pseudonym Stanford Robar. He was particularly active in recording salon and ballad style music.

He lived in San Francisco.

Partial List of compositions

 After All
 A Little Birch Canoe & You
 Amourette
 Answer
 Autumn of Life, The
 Baby Days
 Broken Moon
 Cheerio
 Ching Chong
 Drowsy Baby
 Harlequin
 Harriman Cake Walk
 Hawaiian Nights
 High Ball
 Hula Dreams
 I Miss You Miss America
 Italian Nights
 Lonesome-That's All
 Lover's Lane
 Ma Belle
 Mammy's Lullaby
 March of the Tanks
 Montezuma
 Moon Dreams
 My Country Forever
 Nailo
 Oh! Harold
 Patches
 Please
 Sad Hawaiian Sea
 Slumber Moon
 Smiles
 Souvenir Of The West
 Story of Peter Rabbit
 T'Jours A Moi
 Triennial "K.T." March
 That Old Fashioned Mother Of Mine
 Valse Parisienne
 Wanting You So
 Without Thee
 You Don't Know

References

External links

1884 births
1949 deaths
American male composers
American composers
American pianists
American male pianists
20th-century American male musicians
20th-century American pianists